For the Funkadelic song, see (Not Just) Knee Deep. For the video game, see Knee Deep (video game).

"Knee Deep" is a song recorded by American country music group Zac Brown Band with Jimmy Buffett. It was released in May 2011 as the third single from the Zac Brown Band's second major-label album, 2010's You Get What You Give. It reached number-one on the U.S. Billboard Hot Country Songs chart for one week in August 2011. The song is about laying back and having no worries (some of the lyrics are: "Only worry in the world is the tide gonna reach my chair.")

Background and writing
Co-writer Wyatt Durrette told the website Taste of Country that he has been a longtime fan of Jimmy Buffett and that he wanted to write a beach-themed song. He based the first verse on a breakup. Durrette brought the song to Brown, who helped him complete the second verse and melody. After neither of them could come up with a bridge, they brought the song to Jeffrey Steele, who helped them complete it.

Critical reception
Steve Morse of the Boston Globe called the song "festive" and a "highlight" of the album. Country Weekly reviewer Jessica Phillips said that the song was "happy-go-lucky" but "sounds like a derivation of the band's own hit "Toes"." Eric R. Danton of the Hartford Courant called it "exactly the kind of song you'd expect to hear Jimmy Buffett sing, but with more mandolin." Kevin John Coyne, reviewing the song for Country Universe, gave it a B+ rating, saying that the song "lacks spunk but radiates the same sea-breezy blissfulness" as "Toes".

Knee Deep debuted on the Billboard Hot 100 at number 73 the week ending May 28, 2011. The song kept ascending and fell twice before reaching a final peak of number 18 the week ending August 6, 2011. The song was last seen in its 20th week on the chart at number 62, before being moved to recurrent status. More than two months later, Knee Deep was ranked by Billboard as the 80th most popular song of 2011 in the Year-End. Colder Weather is also on the year-end chart, giving Zac Brown Band a total of 4 year-end singles, with Knee Deep narrowly the highest. Knee Deep remains Zac Brown Band’s biggest hit to date. It's also Jimmy Buffett's third year-end single since entering the year-end 34.

Music video
The music video was directed by Darren Doane. It was filmed in Careyes, Mexico. The video features actress Juliette Lewis.

Charts and certifications

Weekly charts

Year-end charts

Certifications

Release history

References

2011 singles
2010 songs
Zac Brown Band songs
Jimmy Buffett songs
Vocal collaborations
Songs written by Jeffrey Steele
Songs written by Zac Brown
Songs written by Wyatt Durrette (songwriter)
Atlantic Records singles
Song recordings produced by Keith Stegall
Bigger Picture Music Group singles